Cheras (Pha̍k-fa-sṳ: Tsiâu-lai) is a suburban and a district, straddling both the Federal Territory of Kuala Lumpur and Hulu Langat District in the state of Selangor, Malaysia.

The township is located to the south-east of downtown Kuala Lumpur. Cheras is also adjacent to Ampang to the north and Kajang to the south, both of which are major towns within the metropolitan area of taman sgr perdana cheras.

The district mainly consist of Chinese residents, which also make up the majority of voters for the Cheras electorate. Cheras name may origin from the Cheras dynasty from India. Cholas , Cheran and Pandiyan are 3 dynasty which was ruling south India during the year 800 to 1300. The Cholas came to Malaysia , Indonesia and IndoChina. The name of Cheras may origin from the Cheras kingdom in india. We can refer to Cheras dynasty .

Education 

 Beaconhouse Newlands International School
 Cempaka National School
 Oxburgh International School (Oxburgh Academy)
 Sri Sempurna International School
 Sunway College @ Velocity
 UCSI International School Kuala Lumpur
 UCSI University
 YPC International College

Transportation 
Cheras is served by a number of stations on the MRT Kajang Line which includes the  AEON–Maluri,  Taman Pertama,  Taman Midah,  Taman Mutiara,  Taman Connaught,  Taman Suntex and  Sri Raya.

The district is also served by  AEON–Maluri LRT station and  Cheras LRT station on the Ampang and Sri Petaling lines respectively.

Politics 
The current Member of Parliament (MP) for the Cheras parliamentary constituency is Tan Kok Wai from Pakatan Harapan, who won the seat in the 2018 Malaysian general election. He has all along been the Member of Parliament for Cheras since 1995 when the constituency was first established.

References

External links
 

Suburbs in Kuala Lumpur